A door card (in British English) or a door panel (in American English) is an insert on the door of a vehicle that covers the door's internal components.

Design
The door card will usually match the rest of the vehicle's interior. Door panels were formerly made of cardboard with an upholstered interior finish of  vinyl, leather, cloth, carpet, or other materials for the decorative trim. Modern cars typically have door cards made of plastic, most often using injection moulding, as well as incorporating other decorative materials.

The door panel typically incorporates other parts that contribute to the appearance, functionality, and ergonomics of the vehicle. These include armrests, switches or other controls for windows and the locking mechanism, convenience lights, audio speakers, storage compartments, and other features.

In most cases, the door card is attached to the car's door frame by visible screws and ones hidden behind decorative plugs or under the armrest, as well as spring clips.

See also
Vehicle door

References

Automotive body parts
Car doors